Kanthaiya Kunarasa or Senkaiahliyan (In Tamil : செங்கை ஆழியான்) was a Sri Lankan Tamil writer who emerged after the 1960s. He is also the author of several non-fiction books. He also served as the registrar of the University of Jaffna.

Biography
Kunarasa was born in 1941 in Jaffna and died on 28 February 2016. He graduated from the University of Ceylon, Peradeniya and later on obtained his Doctorate in Geography (Land use and Land settlement) from the University of Jaffna. Not only a prolific writer, he was also a well known critic in the literary world. He has  more than thirty novels and three accomplishments in the sphere of fictional history to his credit. Kunarasa was awarded the Sahithiya Mandala awards more than six times for his achievements in writing Novels and short stories. Some of his short stories had been translated into Sinhala and published in  weeklies such as Silumina, Vivarana, Ravaya, and so on. One of his novels, named 'The Beast', was translated into English.

Books written

Researches

Other books

See also 

 List of Tamils of Sri Lanka
 Tamil language
 Tamil literature

References

Kattaru- by Senkaiahliyan.
Vaanum Kanal Sorium- by Senkaiahliyan.

Sri Lankan Tamil writers
Alumni of the University of Ceylon (Peradeniya)
Tamil-language writers
Sri Lankan Tamil activists
Sri Lankan Tamil literature
1941 births
2016 deaths
Alumni of the University of Jaffna